Lisco may refer to one of the following:

 Lisco, Nebraska, a census-designated place in the United States
 Lisco State Aid Bridge, listed on National Register of Historic Places
 Adrian Esquino Lisco (died 2007), El Salvadoran activist
 Emil Gustav Lisco (1819-1887), German Protestant minister
 Friedrich Gustav Lisco (1791-1866), German Protestant theologian
 Libyan Iron and Steel Company, a Libyan steelmaker